Dong Zhao (July 4, 1902 - September 30, 1977) was a Kuomintang general from Shaanxi. A graduate of the Whampoa Military Academy, he fought against the Chinese Workers' and Peasants' Red Army. During the war against the Empire of Japan, he fought against Japanese forces at Xuzhou, Jiangsu. In July 1948, he was made governor of his home province. In May 1949, after the People's Liberation Army captured Xi'an, he fled to Hanzhong and later to Sichuan province. On December 19, 1949, he left mainland China for Taiwan.

National Revolutionary Army generals from Shaanxi
Republic of China politicians from Shaanxi
1977 deaths
Kuomintang politicians in Taiwan
Politicians from Xi'an
1902 births
Taiwanese people from Shaanxi